William Henry Becker (August 26, 1909 – February 2, 1992) was a United States district judge of the United States District Court for the Western District of Missouri.

Education and career

Born in 1909, Becker received a Bachelor of Laws from University of Missouri School of Law in 1932. He was in private practice  law in Columbia, Missouri from 1932 to 1961. He was special counsel to the Missouri Insurance Department from 1936 to 1944. He was counsel to Governor Lloyd Stark in the Kansas City criminal investigation from 1938 to 1939. He was a United States Naval Reserve Lieutenant from 1944 to 1947. He was special assistant to the director of Economic Stabilization Commission of the United States from 1945 to 1946. He was special commissioner for the Supreme Court of Missouri from 1954 to 1958.

Federal judicial service

Becker was nominated by President John F. Kennedy on August 21, 1961, to a seat on the United States District Court for the Western District of Missouri vacated by Judge Albert Alphonso Ridge. He was confirmed by the United States Senate on September 8, 1961, and received his commission on September 18, 1961. He served as Chief Judge from 1965 to 1977. He was a member of the Judicial Panel on Multidistrict Litigation from 1968 to 1977. He was a Judge of the Temporary Emergency Court of Appeals from 1977 to 1992. He assumed senior status on February 8, 1977. His service was terminated on February 2, 1992, due to his death in Columbia.

References

Sources
 

1909 births
1992 deaths
Judges of the United States District Court for the Western District of Missouri
United States district court judges appointed by John F. Kennedy
20th-century American judges
United States Navy officers
People from Brookhaven, Mississippi
University of Missouri School of Law alumni